Boudry is a town in the Boudry Department of Ganzourgou Province in central Burkina Faso. It is the capital of Boudry Department, and has a population of 1,682.

References

External links
Satellite map on Google Maps

Populated places in the Plateau-Central Region
Ganzourgou Province